Martin F. Tanahey (1874 – May 20, 1930) was an American politician who was the alderman of New York City's 1st district from 1922 to his death in 1930. A Democrat, he served much of the Lower East Side and Financial District in Manhattan.

Born in the Lower East Side, Tanahey was a member of the Tammany Hall political machine, serving under boss Thomas Foley and holding appointed posts in the early 20th century before becoming alderman. Popular but in poor health, Tanahey was considered a possible Tammany leader of the 1st district after Foley's 1925 death but yielded to colleague Peter J. Hamill. He and Hamill would continue to be a part of local politics until Hamill died in January 1930; Tanahey himself would die of pneumonia in May. A playground was named in Tanahey's honor in 1952.

Early life and career
Martin F. Tanahey was born in the Lower East Side in 1874. At the time, Tammany Hall was a political machine that catered to the working class, especially Irish immigrants. Its leader in Lower Manhattan, Thomas "Tom" Foley, held picnics for lower- and working-class families, and had helped the young Al Smith with his political career. Tanahey was another attaché of Foley, and was popular with gamblers of the Lower East Side, who organized the "second annual coaching party of the Martin F. Tanahey Association" in 1900.

Tanahey began serving office around 1908, as chief clerk of the New York State Labor Department and later an assistant government appraiser in President Woodrow Wilson's administration. The latter appointment, which earned $3,500 ($ in 2021) a year, was one of eight such positions deemed "choice morsels of patronage" by the New York Herald. Prior to the early 1920s, Tanahey and Foley were in New York County's 2nd Assembly district; after reapportionment, the 2nd district was merged into the 1st district.

Aldermanic tenure
Tanahey was first elected to the New York City Board of Aldermen in 1921, taking office on January 1, 1922. Within the Board he represented the 1st aldermanic district, which was coterminous with the 1st Assembly district. The district approximately covered Manhattan south of 10th Street, Broadway, Canal Street and Gouverneur Slip, encompassing the Financial District, Two Bridges, and most Lower East Side neighborhoods. Tanahey was one of the speakers of an event held by old friends of Smith, who had become the governor, on October 26, 1924. Several old associates of Smith from Manhattan, Brooklyn, and Queens attended the gathering.

When Foley died in 1925, Tanahey was one of seven people jointly acting as district leader. One of Foley's most intimate friends was tax commissioner John F. Gilchrist, who was an easy choice as the new leader but declined. Tanahey and Assemblyman Peter J. Hamill emerged as the two major candidates, which attracted more interest than usual as it was in Smith's home district. Tanahey's supporters noted that he lived in the former 2nd district like Foley, whereas Hamill lived in the western part of the new district. Tanahey's poor health, however, made him yield the contest to Hamill. Tammany Hall subsequently divided the district between Broadway; Hamill would lead the district east of Broadway despite his residence.

Tanahey and Hamill led the memorial procession for Foley at the third anniversary of his death. At the time of the 1928 presidential election, New York's 1st congressional district was split between Lower Manhattan and Staten Island. Both state parties sent one delegate and one alternate delegate representing each part of the district to their conventions; Tanahey was the Democratic alternate delegate from the Manhattan portion while Hamill served as its main delegate. Hamill died of complications from appendicitis on January 13, 1930.

 

As alderman, Tanahey broke ground for a playground on Cherry Street in 1925. Tanahey and Murray W. Stand were the only aldermen to vote against a 3 a.m. curfew on nightclubs to take effect on January 1, 1927. The ordinance exempted hotels with more than 50 rooms, which critics like Stand argued meant that the ordinance targeted small businesses.  Some supporters of the ordinance, however, justified their support for it upon criticizing out-of-towners as sullying New York's reputation and causing commotion.

Personal life and death
Tanahey married, and had three daughters and five sons.

Tanahey died after a two-day bout of pneumonia in his home on May 20, 1930; he had been suffering from arthritis in the prior six months. The funeral was held at St. Teresa Church on May 23. In death he was described by The New York Times as "long ... a picturesque and popular figure in New York politics". On May 27, the remainder of the Board of Aldermen elected David A. Mahoney to fill his vacancy; Mahoney had been Hamill's secretary and assumed Tammany leadership of the eastern 1st district upon his death. Martin F. Tanahey Playground in Two Bridges was named in his honor in 1952.

Notes

References

Works cited

New York City Council members
1874 births
1930 deaths
Deaths from pneumonia in New York City
New York (state) Democrats